Óscar Trigo Diez (born September 25, 1972, in Gràcia, Barcelona) is a wheelchair basketball coach.  He led the Spanish men's national team at the 2012 Summer Paralympics in London.

Personal 
Trigo was born on September 25, 1972, in Gracia, Barcelona.  He has worked as a physical education teacher. In 2013, he lived in Sabadell.

Wheelchair basketball 
Trigo was introduced to the game of wheelchair basketball while a volunteer at the 1992 Summer Paralympics in Barcelona. Since his early involvement with the game in Spain, the sport has evolved and he has participated in the game's professionalization.

National team 
Trigo first became involved with the national team in 2008 through work with Sports Federation for Persons with Physical Disabilities (FEDDF) when he worked with the under-22 national team. Coaching the under-22 team, he led them to a gold medal finish at the Turkey hosted under-23 European Championships in 2008.  In the same role, he guided the team to a second-place finish at the 2009 Paris hosted under-22 European Championships. As the coach for the senior national team, he was involved in bringing higher standards of player preparation to the game, including formalizing training and nutrition.  He has also made the role of national coach more important in terms of player selection for the national squad.  He coached the national team at the 2009 European Championships in Turkey.

The members of the men's and women's national team participated in the XVIII International Memorial Trophy Joan Palau Francàs in Barcelona in 2011.  With the rest of Spain team coached by Trigo, there were teams from Belgium and France, with a team representing the Catalan region of Spain.  The rest of Spain team, who defeated the Catalan region team in their first match by a score of 82–41. He then coached the team to a 74–39 victory of Belgium.

Trigo selected the team for and coached the team that finished third at the 2011 European Championships in Israel. In January 2012, he held a national team training camp where he invited 25 players to participate.  The camp was part of the London selection process. The Spanish national competed in wheelchair basketball at the 2012 Summer Paralympics in London. In London, the team was coached by Trigo.

Club 
The first club side Trigo coached was FCBarcelona-Guttmann in the top level of Spanish club wheelchair basketball. 
He has also coached the  Hospital Guttmann FC Barcelona team, and the Catalan representative team.
In 2012 and 2013, he coached the club side CE San Nicolau in the Spanish Basketball League.  He joined the team in late 2012, and  has missed a few games because of his coaching duties with the national team.  In joining the team, he planned to start a team from scratch with the goal of developing players and progressing the team from the bottom to the top division in Spanish club wheelchair basketball.  The team started in the third division in a Catalan region league.  The team is built into the larger structure of an existing Spanish basketball club.

References 

Spanish basketball coaches
Wheelchair basketball players at the 2012 Summer Paralympics
Living people
1972 births
Paralympic coaches of Spain
Spanish disability sports coaches